Tülər (also, Tullyar, Tyuler, and Tyulyar) is a village and municipality in the Quba Rayon of Azerbaijan.  It has a population of 1,001.

References 

Populated places in Quba District (Azerbaijan)